Echinocardium is a genus of sea urchins of the family Loveniidae, known as heart urchins. The name is derived from the Greek ἐχῖνος (echinos, "hedgehog, urchin") and καρδία (kardia, "heart").

Species

 Echinocardium australe Gray, 1855 
 Echinocardium cordatum (Pennant, 1777) 
 Echinocardium fenauxi Péquignat, 1963
 Echinocardium flavescens (Müller, 1776)    
 Echinocardium gibbosus Agassiz & Desor, 1847
 Echinocardium intermedium Mortensen, 1907
 Echinocardium laevigaster Agassiz
 Echinocardium mediterraneum (Forbes, 1844)
 Echinocardium mortenseni Thiéry, 1909
 Echinocardium pennatifidum Norman, 1868
 Echinocardium sebae Gray

References

Sources
 
 MarBEF Data System - ERMS - Echinocardium Gray, 1825

Spatangoida
Taxa named by John Edward Gray